Pseudanarta flavidens is a moth of the family Noctuidae. It is in North America, including Colorado and Arizona.

The wingspan is about 26 mm.

External links
Images
Bug Guide

Xyleninae
Moths described in 1879